Events in the year 1827 in Argentina.

Incumbents

Events
 February 20 – Cisplatine War: Battle of Ituzaingó
 April 7–8 – Battle of Monte Santiago

Births

Deaths
 February 20 – Federico de Brandsen, French-born military officer and veteran of Argentine War of Independence, killed in action

 
1820s in Argentina